Admiral Gardner may refer to:

Alan Gardner, 1st Baron Gardner (1742–1809), British Royal Navy admiral
Alan Gardner, 2nd Baron Gardner (1770–1815), British Royal Navy admiral
Christopher Gardner (Royal Navy officer) (born 1962), British Royal Navy vice admiral
Matthias B. Gardner (1897–1975), U.S. Navy vice admiral
Admiral Gardner (1797 EIC ship)